Jennidayus is a crustacean genus in the family Gynodiastylidae.

References

External links

Cumacea
Crustacean genera